Heimdall is an action role-playing game developed by The 8th Day, published by Core Design, and released in 1991 for the Amiga and for the Atari ST and DOS in 1992, with a console version created for the Sega Mega-CD in early 1994. The game features a mixture of puzzle-solving, exploration, and dynamic combat mechanics, in which players must explore various islands in the search for the fabled weapons belonging to the gods of Norse mythology. The game received favourable reviews upon its release, though the console version was given mixed feedback by reviewers.

A sequel to the game, entitled Heimdall 2, was developed by the same group and released three years later in 1994.

Gameplay
Players begin a new game by controlling the lead character Heimdall through a series of arcade-style trials - axe-tossing (cutting a maid's braids); boar hunting; and fighting on a ship - which influence the character's stats and the crew members they can choose to use during a playthrough. After completing the trials, the player then choose five characters to form a crew with alongside the main character. While Heimdall falls under the class of "Chieftain", the others fall under Viking-styled classes - Warrior, Wizard, Shipwright, Navigator, Druid, Blacksmith and Berserker - who each differ in stats and skills. Each class has their own strength - while warriors make good melee fighters, wizards can cast spells more efficiently and identify scrolls and items more proficiently, whilst navigators can alert the player if their travel to another island might damage the party. The most critical stat of characters is energy - while this can be replenished by eating food, any character who loses all their energy is dead and must be revived by magic.

The game features three modes - Navigation Map, Island Exploration, and Combat. Island Exploration is conducted via an isometric perspective, in which the player explores an island through different rooms. Players can take only Heimdall and two crew members with them onto the island, and can only leave the island by the entry point they came in by. Most islands have a range of traps - pits, spikes and arrows - that can damage the player, along with various monsters based on Norse mythology. In addition, players can acquire weapons, scrolls, gold, food and various other items from either combat, treasure chests or just lying around. Some islands feature NPCs who can be interacted with, some of whom act as shops where players can buy or sell items.

Combat begins when the player interacts with monsters at their current location, though some are triggered by moving past a point. In combat, the player must reduce an enemy's energy to zero, while avoiding the same with their party. Only one character can fight, who can use various weapons such as bare knuckles, swords, axes, and throwing daggers to do damage, use spells, defend against attacks, or flee from combat. Attacks are done in real-time, and what weapons and spells can be used depends on what each character possess in their inventory. If a player completes a battle, they may earn a prize from their opponent.

The Navigation Map focuses on moving around the current game world the player is in, based on the main quest they are conducting. In this mode, players can rearrange their crew to denote who explores the island with Heimdall, as well as rearrange a party's inventory. Travelling between islands requires the player to choose a location they can reach from their current position - to reach a distant shore, players must move to an island that connects to it, but can decide whether to explore an island or continue travelling. The game features three major world maps to explore, each connected to a main quest to complete.

Plot
The game begins with the Norse god Loki stealing Odin's sword, Freyr's spear and Thor's hammer and hiding them within the mortal world of the Vikings. Left powerless by his trickery, the gods decide to create an infant amongst the mortals who can bring back their weapons. In a small village of Vikings, a young woman finds herself magically pregnant with god's destined offspring, and gives birth to Heimdall. Upon growing to adulthood and completing a series of trials. Heimdall begins his search for the gods' weapons. In doing so, he explores the realms of Utgard, Midgard and Asgard, overcoming traps and monsters and eventually returns home with the missing weapons. Upon returning to his village, the gods bring him to them, and anoint him as one of their own for returning their power to them.

Reception
Computer Gaming World stated that only those new to role-playing games would enjoy Heimdall, while given the existence of more sophisticated games, experienced players will find some other better titles of the genre. Reviewer Gary Whitta gave the Amiga version a score of 895 (out of a possible 1000), praising its mix of gameplay styles, cartoon-like graphics and longevity.

Reviewing the Sega CD version, GamePro commented that the graphics are mediocre during exploration and puzzle-solving but better in the combat view, and that the music is "unobtrusive" but substandard for a CD game. Like Computer Gaming World, they deemed it an RPG for beginners rather than experienced fans of the genre.

References

External links
 
 Heimdall at the Hall of Light
 

1991 video games
Acorn Archimedes games
Amiga games
Atari ST games
Action-adventure games
Core Design games
DOS games
Golden Joystick Award winners
Sega CD games
Single-player video games
Square Enix franchises
Video games based on Norse mythology
Video games with isometric graphics
Video games developed in the United Kingdom
Video games set in the Viking Age
Video games set on fictional islands
Virgin Interactive games